

Gmina Radków is an urban-rural gmina (administrative district) in Kłodzko County, Lower Silesian Voivodeship, in south-western Poland.

Neighbouring gminas
Gmina Radków is bordered by the town of Kudowa-Zdrój and the gminas of Kłodzko, Nowa Ruda and Szczytna. It also borders the Czech Republic.

Villages
Apart from the town of Radków, the gmina contains the villages of Gajów, Karłów, Pasterka, Raszków, Ratno Dolne, Ratno Górne, Ścinawka Dolna, Ścinawka Górna, Ścinawka Średnia, Suszyna, Tłumaczów and Wambierzyce.

Twin towns – sister cities

Gmina Radków is twinned with:

 Pniewy, Poland
 Radków, Poland
 Zadzim, Poland
 Adršpach, Czech Republic
 Bezděkov nad Metují, Czech Republic
 Bukovice, Czech Republic
 Dobruška, Czech Republic
 Hejtmánkovice, Czech Republic
 Hynčice, Czech Republic
 Křinice, Czech Republic
 Machov, Czech Republic
 Martinkovice, Czech Republic
 Meziměstí, Czech Republic
 Opočno, Czech Republic
 Otovice, Czech Republic
 Police nad Metují, Czech Republic
 Šonov, Czech Republic
 Suchý Důl, Czech Republic
 Velké Petrovice, Czech Republic
 Žďár nad Metují, Czech Republic
 Anröchte, Germany
 Schöpstal, Germany

References

Radkow
Kłodzko County